Martin Petrásek (born 26 March 1966, in Ostrov) is a former Czech cross-country skier who competed from 1988 to 2001. He earned a bronze medal in the 4 × 10 km relay at the 1989 FIS Nordic World Ski Championships and also finished 10th in the 10 km event at the 1991 championships.

Petrásek's best individual finish at the Winter Olympics was 24th in the 30 km event in 1992. His only individual victory was in a 15 km event in Austria in 1993.

Cross-country skiing results
All results are sourced from the International Ski Federation (FIS).

Olympic Games

World Championships
 1 medal – (1 bronze)

World Cup

Season standings

Team podiums
 1 podium – (1 ) 

Note:  Until the 1999 World Championships, World Championship races were included in the World Cup scoring system.

References

External links
 

1966 births
Living people
Czech male cross-country skiers
Olympic cross-country skiers of Czechoslovakia
Olympic cross-country skiers of the Czech Republic
Cross-country skiers at the 1988 Winter Olympics
Cross-country skiers at the 1992 Winter Olympics
Cross-country skiers at the 1994 Winter Olympics
FIS Nordic World Ski Championships medalists in cross-country skiing
Czechoslovak male cross-country skiers
People from Ostrov (Karlovy Vary District)
Sportspeople from the Karlovy Vary Region